Edmund Francis Law, usually referred to as 'E. F. Law', (26 April 1810 – 14 April 1882, in Northampton) FRIBA was an English architect during the 19th century, notable for a large number of projects, particularly restorations, in the counties of Northamptonshire, Leicestershire and Rutland.

Career
His practice was based in Northampton from 1837 operating from Priory Cottage in the town. He became a Fellow of the Royal Institute of British Architects in 1862, proposed by George Gilbert Scott and others. He was also Northamptonshire County and Northampton Town Surveyor and served as Mayor of Northampton Borough in 1859.  He went into partnership with Robert Clarke in 1848. This partnership was short-lived, and dissolved on 31 July 1849.

He had a son, Edmund Law (1840 – 14 April 1904) who was articled to his father from 1855 and continued as his assistant at that time based at 29 Abington Street, Northampton. From 1863 he became a partner with his father and also an assistant with his father as Northamptonshire County and Northampton Town Surveyor. His son also became a Fellow of the Royal Institute of British Architects (RIBA) in 1881.

Notable works
RIBA does not have a full list of his works but has a full list of his son's works. The following list is partial in chronological order:

 Northampton, Church of St Andrew, St Andrews Street (since demolished) 1841–42
 Northampton, National Westminster Bank in The Drapery, 1841. Nikolaus Pevsner says: it is "a remarkable building, restrained, grand, and pure. In the Palladian style with giant columns and a pediment". The exterior is currently (2014) obscured by a bus stop. Formerly part of the Northamptonshire Union Bank, acquired by National Provincial Bank, 1920, and NatWest c. 1970.
 National School building (former – now cottages), Bugbrooke, Northamptonshire, 1844
 Northampton, Lloyd Armshouses, south of Abington Avenue, 1846 in the Tudor style 
 Chelveston, Northamptonshire St John Baptist Church: north arcade 1849–50
 Northampton, The Royal Insurance Company building on the Market Square, demolished c. 1961 together with the Emporium Arcade and replaced with mediocre buildings according to Pevsner: "Law's building was only three bays wide but monumental in the Italian Cinquecento style..."
 Sibbertoft, Northamptonshire, The school next to the church, 1846,
 Kettering, Northamptonshore, Corn Exchange and Town Hall 1853
 Winwick, Church of St Michael – chancel replaced by Victorian one, 1853 
 Rushton, Northamptonshire, All Saints' Church, restorations 1853 and 1869
 Culworth, Northamptonshire Rectory alterations 1854
 Church of St John the Baptist, Blisworth, Northamptonshire, restoration 1856
 Church of St Mary, Little Addington, Northamptonshire, restoration 1857
 Wellingborough Church of England mortuary chapel c. 1857–58, London Road cemetery. Listed Grade: II
 Moreton Pinkney Manor – entrance arch 1859
 Naseby Manor – alterations 1859
 Tiffield, Northamptonshire St John the Baptist Church, renewal, 1859
 Church of St Peter, Weedon Bec, Northamptonshire, chancel, rebuilt 1863
 Finedon Hall neo-Elizabethan extension of c. 1850 believed to be the work of E. F. Law
 Church of St Giles, Northampton, Grade I listed Work based on 1840 report of George Gilbert Scott, including pulpit, Jacobean, 1863
 Horton, Northamptonshire Church of St Mary Magdalene, rebuilt 1863–1864
 Clipston, Northamptonshire Baptist Chapel front 1864
 Cosgrove, Northamptonshire Church of St Peter and St Paul, restoration 1864 (Described by Pevsner as: badly over-restored...the result of Law trying to re-gothicize what had been made plain Georgian in 1770-4.)
 Yardley Gobion Church of St Leonard, nave and chancel, bellcote at the east end of the nave, 1864
 Manor House, Rectory and semi-detached houses, Ashley, Northamptonshire 1865
 Collingtree Grange, Northamptonshire 1865, demolished 1960s; lodges and entrance on the A45 road remain; the park now a golf course and up-market housing estate.
 East Carlton Almshouses, Northamptonshire rebuilt 1866
 Clay Coton, Northamptonshire St Andrew's Church restoration 1866
 Northampton, northernmost house in Cheyne Walk, High Victorian Gothic, 1868
 East Carlton Hall, Northamptonshire 1870
 Adstone Rectory, Northamptonshire 1870
 Thornby, Northamptonshire, Church of St Helen, rebuilding and additions
 Welford, Northamptonshire, Church of St Mary, 1872, north aisle and arcade
 Northampton 9 Guildhall Road, 1872–73, in the Gothic style in red brick, once used as an hotel
 East Carlton Rectory, Northamptonshire 1873
 Brockhall, Northamptonshire – St Peter and St Paul church – re-building 1874
 Culworth, Northamptonshire Parish Church alterations 1880
 St Mary's Church, Badby, Northamptonshire – restoration 1880–81
 Manor House restoration in the Tudor style, Bugbrooke, Northamptonshire 1881
 All Saints' Church, Northampton redecoration on the chancel, 1888
 Guilsborough Grammar School, Northamptonshire; Major restoration in 1858–1859 working with builders Cosford at a cost of about £1641. (Source Guilsborough Historical Society).

References

1810 births
1882 deaths
People from Northampton
19th-century English architects
English ecclesiastical architects
Fellows of the Royal Institute of British Architects
Architects from Northamptonshire